Tarauacá River ( is a river of Amazonas and Acre states in western Brazil. The Rio Tarauacá is a tributary of the  Juruá River, which itself flows into the Amazon.

Course

The headwaters of the Tarauacá are located near the Brazilian border with Peru. 
It is upper reaches it flows from south to north through the Alto Tarauacá Extractive Reserve, created in 2000.
The Brazilian cities of Tarauacá and Eirunepé lie along the banks of the Tarauacá River further east.

See also
List of rivers of Acre
List of rivers of Amazonas

References

Rivers of Acre (state)
Rivers of Amazonas (Brazilian state)